The Bedford Village Historic District is a national historic district in Bedford, Westchester County, New York. The district contains 80 contributing buildings and one contributing site. It encompasses most of the original 1680 hamlet and is laid out in a typical village green plan. Notable buildings include the court house (1787), library (1807), school house (1829), post office (c. 1838), and Presbyterian church (1872). The buildings are good examples of the Greek Revival and Gothic Revival styles. Two of the buildings are now museums.

History 
It is on hilly terrain with light soil. The settlers in Bedford came from Connecticut around 1680 and built a hamlet. The pattern of the settlement is common in Massachusetts but rare in New York State. The town was planned around a triangular common where three roads met. Around it were at first three plots, which were assigned by lot to the first 20 settlers who planned to farm in common. The concept worked only for a short time but left its mark on the structure of Bedford, which became a market town. It was at times the seat of the county government during the Revolutionary War and one of two county seats, with a county court house, until 1870. The common village green is surrounded by the court house from 1787, the Historical Hall from 1806, a library, which was previously the Bedford Academy, from 1807, a school house built from cut stone in 1829, a post office and a general store from around 1838, and the Presbyterian church in Gothic Revival style from 1872. The buildings represent a New England village in Westchester County. The hamlet was under a Connecticut license until 1700, when it was assigned to New York State on an order by King William.

A Brief History of the Presbyterian Church at Bedford, N.Y. from the Year 1680 was written by Reverend Heroy and published in 1874. It describes the history of the building, including the laying of the cornerstone and the services celebrating the dedication of the then most recently restored building in 1872.

The Westchester County Historical Society notes that the Bedford Village Historic District is of both historical and architectural importance as an unusual example of a "colonial New England pattern of home plots and jointly owned farm land" in New York State. During the Revolutionary War, it served as a center of resistance, a supply center, and the home of a county government house. After the war, buildings in Federal style, Greek Revival style and Victorian style were erected in Bedford, which was for a long time "one of the most vital farming and trading centers in the county".

The district was added to the National Register of Historic Places in northern Westchester County in 1973. The Bedford Historical Society runs two museums, one in the former court house and another in the former school house.

Buildings

1787 Bedford Court House 

The court house was built in 1787. It is the oldest government building of Westchester County and one of three court houses in New York State from before 1800. It was erected for Bedford as the county seat from 1788 to 1870. In the court room were judges such as William Jay, son of John Jay, the first chief justice of the United States, and attorneys such as Aaron Burr, who later was vice president under Thomas Jefferson.

The court house was restored in 1889 and once again from 1965 to 1970. It houses the museum for the Historic District. In a tradition dating back to its first use, it is also a venue for lectures and meetings, and mock trials have also been performed in the courtroom.

1829 School House 

The school house was built in 1829 in the span of a few months. It had one room, which served for lessons in "grammar, spelling, arithmetic, history, geography, the Bible, and depending on the scholarship of the teacher, Latin and philosophy". A school library had books about history, travel, natural sciences, agriculture, biographies, and literature, listed in an 1843 directory. Sixty-two children were educated in 1842, but 27 of them were at school for four to five months only. When the school was too small for a growing population in 1912, the building was turned into a museum founded by the Bedford Agassiz Society in 1913. It has been run by the Bedford Historical Society since 1918. In 1970, the school became a special exhibit for historic education.

1872 Presbyterian Church 

Today's Presbyterian Church on the village green was built in 1872 as the fourth on the site. The first minister, Reverend Thomas Denham, settled in 1684, and a meeting house was built in 1689. When Bedford became part of New York, this house was transferred to Rye, New York. Bedford was part of the Anglican Church until the Revolution. A second meeting house was burned by the British in 1779. A third house was transferred to Westmoreland Sanctuary. The fourth church was built in 1872.

See also
 National Register of Historic Places listings in northern Westchester County, New York

References

External links

 
 
 
 Bedford Historical Society website and Historic Bedford Village Map
 Historic districts bedfordny.gov
 Richard Peck: Bedford Properties Bear the 1776 Look The New York Times June 22, 1975

Historic districts on the National Register of Historic Places in New York (state)
Gothic Revival architecture in New York (state)
Greek Revival architecture in New York (state)
Buildings and structures in Westchester County, New York
National Register of Historic Places in Westchester County, New York